Selma Ida Jacobsson (27 January 1841, in Stockholm – 30 March 1899, in Stockholm) was a Swedish photographer.

Selma Jacobsson was born to the merchant Levi Abraham Jacobsson and Sally Pohl, the sister of the opera singer Agnes Jacobsson and the architect Ernst Jacobsson, and married the Armenian linguist Norayr de Byzance in 1881. 

She was a student of Bertha Valerius. She opened her own photographic studio in Stockholm in 1872. She was a successful photographer with clients within the diplomatic corps and high society. In 1899, she was appointed "Kungl. Hoffotograf" ('Photographer of the Royal Court').

Gallery

References 
 Tidningen IDUN, nr 30, 1899
 Du Rietz, Anita, Kvinnors entreprenörskap: under 400 år, 1. uppl., Dialogos, Stockholm, 2013

External links 

 

1841 births
1899 deaths
Swedish women photographers
19th-century Swedish photographers
Swedish courtiers
Artists from Stockholm
19th-century women photographers